Ballroom Stories is a studio album by Waldeck released in 2007. Ballroom Stories is the first album that Waldeck teamed up with Zeebee on. The album features a more trip hop sound than his previous albums.

Critical reception

The album was met with generally positive reviews. Mark Deming from AllMusic said, "Ballroom Stories is electronic dance music designed to evoke the sounds and moods of the 1920s, when glamour and intrigue walked hand in hand at dance halls and speakeasies."

Track listing

Personnel
Brian Amos – vocals
Thomas Berghammer – trumpet
Mort Garson – composer
Bob Hilliard – composer
Peter Huber – trumpet
Albin Janoska – piano
Joy Malcolm – vocals
Ilse Riedler – clarinet
Klaus Waldeck – performer, producer, composer
Zeebee – composer

References 

2007 albums
Klaus Waldeck albums